The stripe-necked mongoose (Urva vitticolla) is a mongoose species native to forests and shrublands from southern India to Sri Lanka.

Characteristics 

It is rusty brown to grizzled grey, has a stout body and short legs, a black stripe that runs laterally on both sides of its neck. Its short tail is mostly black, but grey at the base. Head to body length is 46-50 cm with tail length of 32 cm. Males are larger and heavier than females with the weight of 3.1 kg. Females weigh about 1.7 kg.

Distribution and habitat 

The stripe-necked mongoose is distributed in the Western Ghats and in Sri Lanka.
In 1911, one individual was observed in southern Andhra Pradesh.

Behaviour and ecology 

It is diurnal and feeds on frogs, crabs, mouse deer, black naped hares, rodents, fowl, and reptiles. It generally avoids human habitation. They usually inhabit in riparian habitats or near abandoned tanks. In Sri Lanka, they are sparsely found within protected ranges such as national parks and sanctuaries. However, populations are commonly found over 2000 m altitude. Even though reproduction habits are unclear, pups have been noticed in mid-May.

Taxonomy
There are two subspecies. U. vitticolla vitticolla is from the provinces of Western Ghats, Coorg and Kerala, and has more of a reddish tint to its fur. The other, U. vitticolla inornata, is found in the Kanara province, and lacks a reddish tint to its fur.

See also
 Indian grey mongoose
 Ruddy mongoose

References

Pocock, R.I. (1941). The fauna of British India, including Ceylon and Burma. Mammalia, 2nd Edition, 2. Taylor & Francis, London, U.K.
 Prater, S. H. (1971). The Book of Indian Animals – 3rd Edition.Bombay Natural History Society. Oxford University Press, Bombay, 324pp.
 Corbet, G.B. & J.E. Hill (1992). Mammals of the Indo-Malayan Region: A Systematic Review. Oxford University Press, Oxford, UK.
 Van Rompaey, H. & Jayakumar, M. N. (2003). The Stripe-necked Mongoose, Herpestes vitticollis. Small Carnivore Conservation 28: 14–17.
 Mudappa, D. (2013). Herpestids, viverrids and mustelids, pp. 471–498. In: Johnsingh, A.J.T. & N. Manjrekar (eds.). Mammals of South Asia -1. Universities Press, Hyderabad, India.
 Menon, V. (2014). Indian Mammals - A Field Guide. Hachette India, Gurgaon, India, 528pp.
 Sreehari, R. & P.O. Nameer (2016). Small carnivores of Parambikulam Tiger Reserve, southern Western Ghats, India. Journal of Threatened Taxa 8(11): 9306–9315; https://dx.doi.org/10.11609/jott.2311.8.11.9306-9315
 Nayak, A.K., M.V. Nair & P.P. Mohapatra (2014). Stripe-necked Mongoose Herpestes vitticollis in Odisha, eastern India: A biogeographically significant record. Small Carnivore Conservation 51: 71–73.

stripe-necked mongoose
Mammals of India
Mammals of Sri Lanka
Fauna of South India
stripe-necked mongoose
Taxobox binomials not recognized by IUCN